Pandolfini is an Italian family name. It may refer to:

 Agnolo Pandolfini (1360-1446), Renaissance humanist
 Bruce Pandolfini (born 1947), American chess player and writer
 Egisto Pandolfini (born 1926), Italian footballer
 Gianfranco Pandolfini (1920-1997), Italian water polo player, younger brother of Tullio Pandolfini
 Niccolò Pandolfini (1440-1518), Italian Roman Catholic bishop and cardinal
 Tullio Pandolfini (1914-1999), Italian water polo player
 Turi Pandolfini (1883-1962), Italian film actor

Other uses
 Villa Pandolfini, Renaissance villa near Florence, Italy

Italian-language surnames